Daniel Gillmor (July 1, 1849 – February 22, 1918) was a merchant and political figure in New Brunswick, Canada. He sat for St. George division in the Senate of Canada from 1907 to 1918 as a Liberal.

He was born in St. George, New Brunswick, the son of Arthur Hill Gillmor and Hannah Dawes Howe. His father also served as a Senator (1900-1903). Daniel married Catherine Sophia Duffy on 28 Nov 1877 in Lowell, Middlesex, Massachusetts. They had six children:  two girls and four boys.  He ran unsuccessfully for a seat in the House of Commons in 1904. He died in office at the age of 68.

References 
 
 Irish Canadian Cultural Association of New Brunswick

1849 births
1918 deaths
Canadian senators from New Brunswick